Herbert R. Budd (26 February 1904 – 1979) was an English professional footballer.

Career
Budd began his career with Hanham Athletic, joining Exeter City in the 1926–27 season, but failing to appear in their league team. He joined Torquay United in 1927, making his debut on 17 December in a 1–1 draw at home to Gillingham. He played a further six games that season, Torquay's first in the Football League, scoring twice. He again struggled to make the first team the following season, playing only twice despite Torquay using a number of players at centre-forward that season.

On leaving Torquay he joined non-league Kettering Town and subsequently played for Bath City.

References

1904 births
1979 deaths
Footballers from Bristol
English footballers
Exeter City F.C. players
Torquay United F.C. players
Kettering Town F.C. players
Bath City F.C. players
Association football forwards